Ronald W. Waples (born July 21, 1944, in Toronto, Ontario) is a Canadian harness racer. He was inducted into the Canadian Horse Racing Hall of Fame in 1986, the U.S. Harness Racing Hall of Fame in 1993, and the Little Brown Jug Wall of Fame in 2006. Among his successes in an outstanding and ongoing career he was voted Harness Tracks of America Driver of the Year for 1979 and 1980, plus he drove, trained, and co-owned the colt Ralph Hanover with which he won the Triple Crown of Harness Racing for Pacers in 1983.

References

1944 births
Living people
Canadian harness racing drivers
Canadian harness racing trainers
American harness racers
Canadian Horse Racing Hall of Fame inductees
United States Harness Racing Hall of Fame inductees
Sportspeople from Toronto